Łowczówek  is a village in the administrative district of Gmina Pleśna, within Tarnów County, Lesser Poland Voivodeship, in southern Poland.

During World War I, it was a site of the battle between the Brigade I of the Polish Legions and Russian soldiers.

References

Villages in Tarnów County